Fred Akehurst Woodman (born 10 February 1958) is a former New Zealand rugby union player. A wing, Woodman represented North Auckland at a provincial level, and was a member of the New Zealand national side, the All Blacks, in 1980 and 1981. He played 14 matches for the All Blacks including three internationals. His brother Kawhena Woodman was also an All Black.

References

1958 births
Living people
Ngāpuhi people
People from Kaikohe
New Zealand rugby union players
New Zealand international rugby union players
Northland rugby union players
Rugby union wings
People educated at Northland College, Kaikohe
New Zealand Māori rugby union players
Rugby union players from the Northland Region